All Lies may refer to:
 All Lies (EP), an EP by Japandroids
 "All Lies" (song), a song by Charli Baltimore
 All Lies (film), a 1938 German comedy film